New Zealand at the 1990 Commonwealth Games was represented by a team of 224 competitors and 61 officials. Selection of the team for the Games in Auckland, New Zealand, was the responsibility of the New Zealand Olympic and Commonwealth Games Association. New Zealand's flagbearer at the opening ceremony was swimmer Anthony Mosse, and at the closing ceremony was cyclist Gary Anderson. The New Zealand team finished fourth on the medal table, winning a total of 58 medals, 17 of which were gold.

New Zealand has competed in every games, starting with the British Empire Games in 1930 at Hamilton, Ontario.

Medal tables

| width="78%" align="left" valign="top" |

Triathlon was a demonstration event, and was won by Erin Baker (women) and Rick Wells (men), both from New Zealand.
|style="text-align:left;width:22%;vertical-align:top;"|

Competitors
The following table lists the number of New Zealand competitors who participated at the Games according to gender and sport.

Athletics

Track and road

Field

Combined
Men's decathlon

Sources: 

Women's heptathlon

Sources:

Badminton

Boxing

Cycling

Road

Sources:

Track

Diving

Sources:

Gymnastics

Judo

Lawn bowls

Shooting

Swimming

Synchronised swimming

Sources:

Weightlifting

Officials

See also
New Zealand Olympic Committee
New Zealand at the Commonwealth Games
New Zealand at the 1988 Summer Olympics
New Zealand at the 1992 Summer Olympics

References

External links
NZOC website on the 1990 games
Commonwealth Games Federation website

1990
Nations at the 1990 Commonwealth Games
Commonwealth Games
Sport in Auckland